In optics, differential group delay is the difference in propagation time between the two eigenmodes X and Y polarizations.  Consider two eigenmodes that are the 0° and 90° linear polarization states.  If the state of polarization of the input signal is the linear state at 45° between the two eigenmodes, the input signal is divided equally into the two eigenmodes.  The power of the transmitted signal ET,total is the combination of the transmitted signals of both x and y modes.

 

The differential group delay Dt is defined as the difference in propagation time between the eigenmodes: Dt = |tt,x − tt,y|.

Optics